The Big Steppers Tour is the fifth solo concert tour, and sixth overall, by American rapper Kendrick Lamar, in support of his fifth studio album Mr. Morale & the Big Steppers (2022). The tour began on June 23, 2022, in Milan, and is currently scheduled to conclude on August 20, 2023, in Chiba, consisting of 90 shows. It is Lamar's first solo concert tour since The DAMN. Tour (2017–18).

Described as "a form of 21st century hip hop opera", the tour reflected key themes of Mr. Morale & the Big Steppers by incorporating minimalism and performance art. Its all white stage is split up into three sections connected by a white catwalk, while featuring a white curtain draping over the main stage and a mirrored elevator on the lower stage. Narrated by English actress Helen Mirren, the tour's concept follows the album's titular character, Mr. Morale, as he is guided by his therapist to escape his comfort zone. Light art, props and shadow play are heavily utilized throughout the performance as tools to enhance its storytelling aspects.

The Big Steppers Tour received rave reviews from critics, who commonly labeled it as Lamar's best and most realized tour to date. His "stoic" performance, concept and "high art" inspired stage production were the subjects of universal praise. It was deemed the greatest hip hop show of all time by The Guardian, who writes that Lamar "takes the opportunity that his 'Greatest Rapper Alive' status affords to experiment with form, content and stagecraft in ways that the culture has not seen before." The October 22 show at Accor Arena in Paris was recorded and released as a Prime Video original concert film of the same name.

Development 
On November 12, 2021, American rapper Kendrick Lamar headlined Day N Vegas festival, which marked his first live performance in two years and featured a "theatrical exhibition of his musical eras". On February 13, 2022, Lamar co-headlined the Super Bowl LVI halftime show. Three days later, he was announced as a headliner for the Milano Summer Festival. The following month, he was announced as a headliner for Rolling Loud and Glastonbury Festival.

On May 13, immediately following the release of his fifth studio album Mr. Morale & the Big Steppers, Lamar formally announced the Big Steppers Tour by sharing its promotional poster on Twitter, with Baby Keem and Tanna Leone serving as the opening acts. On May 19, the tour's promoter Live Nation Entertainment and one of its sponsors Cash App held a presale for their "Cash Card" cardholders. Tickets for the general public went on sale the following day. Additional dates were added in Los Angeles and Ontario, California, Melbourne, Sydney, Amsterdam, Paris, London and Dublin following the sales. It was noted in Sounds From Nowhere's review of the European closer at Manchester's AO Arena that Lamar and Baby Keem spent time recording their performance to "take back to L.A" as Lamar put it, potentially for a music video.

Stage and aesthetic 
During the North American leg, Lamar wore custom costumes from Louis Vuitton on stage; they were similar to the outfit he wore while co-headlining the Super Bowl LVI halftime show. Each piece was taken from Virgil Abloh's final menswear collection as Louis Vuitton's artistic director before his death in November 2021. Lamar also sported pendants and earrings from Tiffany & Co., sunglasses from Gentle Monster which were designed by Jennie Kim of Blackpink, and a diamond encrusted glove on his right hand. The gloves resembles the one commonly worn by Michael Jackson. For his homecoming performances in Los Angeles, Lamar wore a Taz Arnold designed white suit painted with pink-red graffiti that honored his hometown of Compton. During the European leg, he wore custom costumes designed by Mexican artist Arlette and British-Jamaican designer Martine Rose.

As the lead creative director, Lamar enlisted his close collaborators Dave Free and Mike Carson as key creatives, Tony Russell as the music director, Charm La'Donna as the lead choreographer, and Christopher Latouche as the story artist. Eleven dancers, seven men and four women, are featured in the performance. The "intense" choreography included two-stepping that resembles "divine nine step shows." The minimalist all white stage design was separated into three sections: a main stage periodically draped with a white curtain, a middle stage, and a lower stage that additionally functions as a mirrored elevator. The three stages are connected by a white catwalk and were intentionally designed to resemble a therapist's office.  The tour experiments with light art, shadow play, pyrotechnics and additional props throughout the performance.

Concert synopsis 
The show begins with the main section of the stage being covered under a white curtain. As the opening lines from "United in Grief" echo throughout the arena, the eleven dancers emerge onto the catwalk. The men, dressed in black, and the women, dressed in white, make their way towards the main section to the instrumental of "Savior (Interlude)". Once the drape raises, the male dancers leave the stage; the female dancers slowly walk to the main section and pose on a bed. Mr. Morale is seen sitting at a piano with a small puppet resembling him resting on top. He performs the first verse of "United in Grief" before he and his puppet walk towards the middle stage. After a small pause, he continues the song by performing the chorus and second verse using ventriloquism.

After the song ends, Mr. Morale's therapist, voiced by actor Helen Mirren, introduces herself as his guide throughout the performance. She informs him that he's been living in his comfort zone, or box, for over 1,855 days (the period of time between the releases of his fourth and fifth studio albums) and that it was time for him to leave that space. He then performs "N95" with pyrotechnics and "ELEMENT." with his silhouette shown against the lowered curtain. Using the introduction from rapper Kodak Black, Mr. Morale performs the first and second verses of "Worldwide Steppers" with shadow play appearing on the curtain. He immediately performs "Backseat Freestyle" and "Rich Spirit" as the curtain rises once more. After skipping his way towards the main stage to the instrumental of "Rich (Interlude)", Mirren tells Mr. Morale that he's "once again let your ego get the best of you" before asking if she needed to remind him of "how this went before". He plays the melody of "HUMBLE." on the piano before performing the full song and descending the main stage.

Using the opening dialogue between himself and his longtime partner Whitney Alford, Mr. Morale is raised back onto the main stage sitting in a chair while performing the first and part of the second verses of "Father Time". Mirren shows sympathy for him, acknowledging that she can't blame him for "being a product of your environment," but advises him that it's "up to you to maneuver through it at this point." Mr. Morale then performs "m.A.A.d city" with some of the dancers, flashlights and additional pyrotechnics. The curtain lowers again before showing a silhouette of Mr. Morale arguing with a woman to the chorus of "We Cry Together". Now on the middle stage, he formally welcomes the audience to the show and performs the chorus and first verse of "Purple Hearts". As he's performing, the silhouetted couple works through their argument and embraces at the end.

After performing "King Kunta", Mr. Morale decides to "check the temperature" of the audience by performing a mashup of "LOYALTY." and "Swimming Pools (Drank)". He deems the audience ready to continue and performs the remix of "Bitch, Don't Kill My Vibe" with a female dancer performing a solo piece behind him. Three more female dancers join him as he performs "Die Hard". They all make their way towards the main stage as the four dancers perform a group piece to "LUST." while Mr. Morale lays in a bed. As he descends the stage, the curtain lowers once more and shows a silhouette that mirrored moving sunlight. Mirren condemns Mr. Morale, telling him that he "did this to himself again." She suggests that he's forgotten who he is and asks if he needed a reminder from her before continuing the performance. Mr. Morale responds by performing "DNA." and is advised by Mirren that in order "to move further, first you have to get past yourself."

Experiencing a breakthrough in his journey, Mr. Morale performs "Count Me Out". During the first verse, he's hunched over with his silhouette, whose back is pierced with arrows, appearing on the lowered curtain. He continues the song with all of his dancers before performing its outro by himself. After a small pause, he performs "Money Trees" and "LOVE." on the lower stage. Mr. Morale is then enclosed in a small box with four male dancers, each wearing hazmat suits. He is then instructed by Mirren to take a COVID-19 test, assuring him that it's "for your own good". After performing "Alright", Mirren then asks the audience if they were entertained before informing Mr. Morale that he has been contaminated. Smoke begins to seep into the box: Mirren assures him that it wasn't lethal. Still enclose in the box, Mr. Morale is elevated into the air while performing "Mirror". He breaks free from the box and performs the chorus and first verse of "Silent Hill". As he's lowered back down, Baby Keem appears on the main stage to perform a mashup of "Vent" and "Range Brothers" before performing a portion of "Family Ties". As Mr. Morale heads back to the main stage, Mirren tells him that the audience seems to follow him now and warns him that "with great power comes great responsibility." He performs "Crown" while playing the piano before being joined by Tanna Leone and all of the dancers to perform "Mr. Morale". "Savior" is the concluding song of the show, where Mr. Morale thanks the audience for attending and flashes a smile as he exits the stage and the curtain is lowered for the final time. Mirren congratulates him for making it out of the box before asking if he can stay out.

Critical reception 
The Big Steppers Tour was met with widespread acclaim from critics, who praised Lamar's performance, concept and stage production. Taiyo Coates of Variety described the show as "performance art at its pinnacle" and that Lamar proves "yet again that his elevated artistry carves an unobstructed path to hip hop's Mount Rushmore." Chris Kelly of The Washington Post called the tour a "theatrical spectacle that rewrote the rules of the rap show in the same way that Lamar has rewritten the rules of rap itself." Bryson "Boom" Paul of Consequence lauded the show's "display of militant precision. Lamar was in sequence with the artistically expressive backdrop, while the impeccable timing of the dancers in unison never missed a step." He also described the overall performance as a "two-hour therapy session, redemption odyssey, and play rolled into one. Fans left the show immensely satisfied. It was must-see experience, period."

Writing for Complex, Andre Gee hailed Lamar as a "stoic performer, leaning on the full scope of the live show to keep fans entertained." He elaborates by writing "the genius of [Lamar's] live show is how he maneuvers the stage with no wasted motion. While some MC's continuously run from side to side, jumping around the stage, [Lamar] moves methodically." Gee further writes that Lamar "knew all eyes were on him, and he did exactly what it took to keep it that way, all without over-exerting himself during the marathon set. Even when he was two-stepping, you soon realized he was just stylishly moving to another part of the stage for the next song." Robyn Mowatt of Okayplayer wrote that the tour "isn't just a rap show, it's an expansive experience. [Lamar]'s headspace is probed, examined, and pushed to the forefront – alongside this ideal, fans are tasked with thinking for themselves rather than relying on Lamar to make up their minds for them. Reckoning with what you’ve pulled from his latest album should lead you to understand why Lamar is a pioneering hip hop figure."

Mikael Wood of the Los Angeles Times praised how Lamar blended the "meditative" songs on his recent studio album with the "rowdy old bangers" present in his previous works, which "served to demonstrate the intellectual ambition of even his most radio-friendly songs." He then wrote that the "most gratifying" part of the performance was Lamar's dancing, which he described as a "series of subtle little glide-and-shimmy moves that made him [look like] somebody's cool uncle turning up right on time to the family cookout." Wood suggested that the description was what Lamar ultimately thought of himself during the performance, "not a hero. Not an idol. Just a guy who's learned how best to carry himself."

Steve Baltin of Forbes noted that the last time he personally saw Lamar perform was at a private party for Kobe Bryant's jersey retirement ceremony, where he performed in front of NBA legends such as Bryant, Bill Russell, Magic Johnson, Jerry West, and Kareem Abdul-Jabbar. After watching Lamar's homecoming performance in Los Angeles, Baltin pieced together why he "was the perfect artist to perform for all those NBA greats," because like them, "Lamar is clearly driven by the quest for greatness. From the opening, [he] performed with the fire and intensity of an athlete determined to bring home the championship on this night." Baltin further praised Lamar's stage presence, expressing that it's why he "has risen to the absolute pinnacle of his musical generation. While others are trying for TikTok followers or staying stupid things like, "Doing it for the 'Gram," Lamar is chasing true artistry not for fame or fortune, but for the desire within to see what he can accomplish. Driven by that internal push, the way great athletes are, he showed at Crypto.com he can reach true artistic greatness. He displayed that again and again throughout the two hours, doing it with style and fervor consistently."

Concert film 

On October 18, 2022, Lamar and Amazon Studios announced that his second performance at Accor Arena in Paris would be livestreamed through Amazon Music's Twitch channel to commemorate the ten-year anniversary of the release of his second studio album Good Kid, M.A.A.D City (2012). The livestream featured Baby Keem and Leone's respective opening performances, and was directed by Mike Carson, Dave Free and Mark A. Ritchie. A director's cut of Lamar's performance was released as a concert film, titled Kendrick Lamar Live: The Big Steppers Tour, exclusively to Amazon Prime Video on November 23.

Personnel 
 Kendrick Lamar – creative direction
 Dave Free – creative direction
 Mike Carson – creative direction
 Tony Russell – music direction
 Christian Coffey – tour direction
 Charm La'Donna – head of choreography
 Cassidy Ratliff – assistant choreographer
 Helen Mirren – narration

Dancers

 Jaheem "FaceOff" Alleyne
 Camryn C. Bridges
 Jaida Brooks
 Rob "Disciple" Bynes
 Christian Davis
 James Dhaïti
 Joya Jackson
 D-Ran Neal
 Jackie Pipkins
 Alekz Samone
 Corey "CT" Turner

Set list 
This set list is from the concert on August 13, 2022, in Toronto. It is not intended to represent all shows from the tour.

 "United in Grief"
 "N95"
 "ELEMENT."
 "Worldwide Steppers"
 "Backseat Freestyle"
 "Rich Spirit"
 "HUMBLE."
 "Father Time"
 "m.A.A.d city"
 "Purple Hearts"
 "King Kunta"
 "LOYALTY." / Swimming Pools (Drank)"
 "Bitch, Don't Kill My Vibe" (Remix)
 "Die Hard"
 "LUST." / "DNA."
 "Count Me Out"
 "Money Trees"
 "LOVE."
 "Alright"
 "Mirror"
 "Silent Hill"
 "Vent" / "Range Brothers" (with Baby Keem)
 "Family Ties" (with Baby Keem)
 "Crown"
 "Mr. Morale" (with Tanna Leone)
 "Savior"

Shows

Cancelled shows

Notes

References

2022 concert tours
2023 concert tours
Concert tours of Australia
Concert tours of Canada
Concert tours of Europe
Concert tours of North America
Concert tours of Oceania
Concert tours of the United Kingdom
Concert tours of the United States
Kendrick Lamar
Rap operas